Walton station may refer to:

Cambridgeshire:
 Walton railway station (Cambridgeshire)

Essex:
Walton-on-the-Naze railway station

Liverpool:
Walton railway station (Merseyside)
Walton & Anfield railway station
Walton on the Hill railway station
The old name for Rice Lane railway station

London:
Walton-on-Thames railway station

Lahore, Pakistan:
Walton railway station (Pakistan)